USS Philadelphia may refer to:

 was a gunboat built in 1776 on Lake Champlain and  sunk during the Battle of Valcour Island
 was a 36-gun sailing frigate active in the Quasi-War, captured in the First Barbary War and later burned
 was a side-wheel steamer used during the American Civil War, commanded by Samuel Phillips Lee
 was a protected cruiser commissioned in 1890 and in service until 1926
 was a light cruiser commissioned 1937, active in World War II, and sold to Brazil in 1951
 is a  attack submarine commissioned in 1977 and decommissioned in 2010

United States Navy ship names